Geerten is a given name. Notable people with this name include:

 Geerten Ten Bosch (born 1959), Dutch graphic designer and illustrator
 Geerten Meijsing (born 1950), Dutch writer, translator and novelist

Dutch feminine given names
Dutch masculine given names